Noelle Lambert (born January 24, 1997) is an American Paralympian track and field athlete and a motivational speaker. She is also the founder of The Born to Run Foundation. She was also a contestant on Survivor 43.

Early life
Lambert was born on January 24, 1997, in Londonderry, New Hampshire, to Geoffrey and Judy Lambert. She played lacrosse at the University of Massachusetts, Lowell, where she studied criminal justice. Lambert lost her left leg following a moped accident on Martha's Vineyard in 2016.

Career

Lambert competed in the 2020 Summer Paralympics in Tokyo. She placed 6th in the 100m T63 with a time of 15.97, setting a new American record.

Survivor
In 2022, Lambert was announced as one of 18 contestants competing on Survivor 43. She finished in eighth place, joining the season's jury. She ultimately voted for the season's eventual winner, Mike Gabler.

Personal life
Lambert founded the "Born to Run" non-profit organization, which helps young adults and children get prostheses.

References

1997 births
Living people
American female freestyle skiers
People from Londonderry, New Hampshire
People from Manchester, New Hampshire
Sportspeople from Manchester, New Hampshire
Sportspeople from New Hampshire
Paralympic track and field athletes of the United States
Survivor (American TV series) contestants